Media Permata is a Malay-language newspaper published Monday to Saturday in Brunei by Brunei Press Sdn Bhd, which also publishes the Borneo Bulletin. The Saturday edition features a special 16-page pull out called Suasana, which offers lifestyle and entertainment news.

See also
Media of Brunei

References

External links
Media Permata
Newspapers published in Brunei
Malay-language newspapers
Publications with year of establishment missing